Rocky Mountain Metropolitan Airport  is a public-use airport located in Broomfield, Colorado, United States. The airport is owned and operated by Jefferson County and is situated midway between Denver and Boulder on U.S. Highway 36. Formerly known as Jefferson County Airport or Jeffco Airport, the airport was renamed Rocky Mountain Metropolitan Airport on October 10, 2006, although it is sometimes referred to as Rocky Mountain Regional Airport, e.g., on 2007–2012 county planning documents.

This airport is included in the National Plan of Integrated Airport Systems for 2011–2015, which categorizes it as a reliever airport. It is home to a large general aviation population including a fair amount of corporate traffic and several flight schools. The airport's proximity to the nearby Interlocken business district contributes to its business traveler clientele. It has a control tower on 118.6 (local) and 121.7 (ground) that is open from 0600 to 2200 local time. ATIS/AWOS broadcasts on 126.25. There are three runways—12/30 Left and Right and 3/21. The runway numbers were changed in November 2014 to reflect a change in magnetic variation. Two fixed-base operators (FBOs) offer fuel and other services.

History 
On February 7, 2012, the Federal Aviation Administration dedicated a new $23.7 million, state-of-the-art airport traffic control tower, located south of the airport runways. The new facility includes a 124-foot-tall control tower topped by a 525-square-foot tower cab with four air traffic controller positions and one supervisor position. A 6,000-square-foot, single-story base building houses administrative offices, training rooms, and equipment rooms.

In the summer of 2018, Pilatus Aircraft officially launched operations out of their newly constructed hangar located on the southwest corner of the airfield.

In the spring of 2018, the airport signed a lease agreement with a second FBO, SheltAir, to act as their "gateway to the west". SheltAir commenced operations in February 2019 with a temporary modular building located at the East Ramp area. Construction for the permanent building and hangar was expected to commence in the spring of 2019.

There exists a vacant tract of airport-owned land just southwest of the runways. As of 2015, there is a 30-year master plan by a development company to redevelop the area, known as Verve Innovation Park, for various aviation- and non-aviation-related uses.

Facilities and aircraft 

The airport's three runways, previously 11L/29R, 11R/29L, and 2/20, were renumbered in November 2014 in order to align them with magnetic directions. At the same time, the primary runway (12L/30R) underwent an $8.83 million renovation.

For the 12-month period ending September 30, 2018, the airport had 175,759 aircraft operations, an average of 482 per day: 92% general aviation, 4% air taxi, 3% military and <1% air carrier. At that time there were 360 aircraft based at this airport: 70% single-engine, 17% multi-engine, 9% jet, and 4% helicopter.

Two fixed-base operators (FBOs) operate at the airport: Signature Flight Support and Sheltair. The United States Forest Service also maintains its Jefferson County Tanker Base at the airport. On July 13, 2016, Pilatus Aircraft broke ground on a new 188,000 sq. ft. North American completion center for the new PC-24 business jet. The facility became fully operational in June 2018.

Airlines and destinations

The airport was formerly a hub for Pet Airways before ceasing all flights in early 2013. Denver Air Connection operated by Key Lime Air also operated from RMMA to Grand Junction before consolidating their operations for the Denver–Grand Junction route to Centennial Airport in May 2017.

Accidents and incidents
On July 17, 2022, A Cessna 336 twin-engine plane operated by Bluebird Aviation went down outside of Boulder, Colorado. The pilot and the three victims departed from Rocky Mountain Metropolitan Airport on a sightseeing trip to the mountains around Boulder, Colorado. Killed in the crash was the pilot, who was not immediately identified by authorities, 48-year-old Sandra Kirby of Louisiana, and her two children, 17-year-old Ian Kirby, and 13-year-old Amanda Kirby. The cause of the Colorado crash is under investigation.
On September 18, 2022, a Cessna 172 that took off from this airport with two people on a training flight, collided in Boulder County with a Sonex aircraft that had taken off from the Platte Valley Airpark with only one person on board, its pilot. Both airplanes crashed and were destroyed on impact, killing all three people on board them.

See also 
 List of airports in Colorado

References

External links 
 
 Rocky Mountain Metropolitan Airport (official site)
 Rocky Mountain Metropolitan Airport (BJC) at Colorado DOT airport directory
 USDA Forest Service Jefferson County Tanker Base
 Classic Airport Tower A Memory
 
 

Airports in Colorado
Transportation in Broomfield, Colorado
Transportation buildings and structures in Jefferson County, Colorado